The Women's team pursuit event of the 2016 UCI Track Cycling World Championships was held on 3 and 4 March 2016. The United States beat Canada in the final to win the gold medal.

Results

Qualifying
The qualifying was started at 13:00.

First round
The winners of the first two heats advanced to the final. After that, the results were used to determine the placement rounds. It was held at 15:20.

Finals
The final were started at 19:05.

References

Women's team pursuit
UCI Track Cycling World Championships – Women's team pursuit